Alchemilla sarmatica is a species of plants belonging to the family Rosaceae.

It is native to Europe and Kazakhstan.

References

sarmatica